Gutsbezirk Münsingen is an unincorporated area in the German district of Reutlingen. It is located in the Swabian Jura (Baden-Württemberg).

References 

Reutlingen (district)
Unincorporated areas of Germany